This is a list of Spanish television related events from 2012.

Events
 9 January – New TV Channel Energy is launched.
 12 January - Channel Discovery Max, starts broadcasting.
 30 March - Paramount Channel, new TV Channel is launched.
 20 April – Spanish  Council of Ministers passes a new  Royal Decree-Law in order to render the public channels management easier.
 1 May – New TV Channel Xplora starts broadcasting.
 29 June: Leopoldo González-Echenique is appointed chairman of Radio Televisión Española.
 1 July – Broadcasting of UEFA Euro 2012 Final by Telecinco rates 83,4% of share with 15,4 million viewers.
 1 October – The Companies Grupo Antena 3 and Gestora de Inversiones Audiovisuales La Sexta merge creating a new group called Atresmedia.
 31 December – New TV Channel Nueve, is launched.

Debuts

Television shows

Ending this year

Changes of network affiliation

Deaths
 1 March - Quique Camoiras, actor, 84.
 15 March - Pepe Rubio, actor, 80.
 17 March - Paco Valladares, actor, 76.
 5 April - César Abeytua, director, 64.
 11 April - Marisa Medina, hostess, 69.
 14 April - Pedro Macía, host, 68.
 26 April - Yolanda Ríos, actress, 60.
 22 June - Juan Luis Galiardo, actor, 72.
 26 June - Gustavo Pérez Puig, director, 71.
 5 July - Pedro Rodríguez Gómez, director and producer, 43.
 23 July - José Luis Uribarri, host, 75.
 23 July - Paco Morán, actor, 81.
 9 August - Sancho Gracia, actor, 75.
 30 August - Carlos Larrañaga, actor, 75.
 13 September - Pablo Sanz, actor, 80.
 13 November - Carmen Martínez Sierra, actress, 108.
 18 November - Emilio Aragón Miliki, clown, 83.
 24 November - Tony Leblanc, actor and director, 90.

See also
 2012 in Spain
 List of Spanish films of 2012

References